The 2014–15 Gonzaga Bulldogs women's basketball team represents Gonzaga University in the 2014–15 college basketball season. The Bulldogs (also informally referred to as the "Zags"), members of the West Coast Conference, were led by new head coach Lisa Fortier; she replaces Kelly Graves, who left to take the head coaching vacancy at Oregon. The Zags play their home games at the McCarthey Athletic Center on the university campus in Spokane, Washington. They finished the season 26-8, 12-4 in WCC play to win the WCC regular season title. They advanced to the semifinals to WCC women's tournament where they lost to BYU. They received at-large bid to the NCAA women's basketball tournament where they upset George Washington in the first round, Oregon State in the second round, before losing to Tennessee in the Sweet Sixteen to end their Cinderella run.

Roster

Schedule

|-
!colspan=9 style="background:#002469; color:white;"| Exhibition

|-
!colspan=9 style="background:#002469; color:white;"| Non-conference regular season

|-
!colspan=9 style="background:#002469; color:white;"| WCC regular season

|-
!colspan=9 style="background:#002965; color:white;"| WCC Women's Tournament

|-
!colspan=9 style="background:#002965; color:white;"| NCAA tournament

Rankings
2014–15 NCAA Division I women's basketball rankings

See also
2014–15 Gonzaga Bulldogs men's basketball team
Gonzaga Bulldogs women's basketball

References

Gonzaga
Gonzaga Bulldogs women's basketball seasons
Gonzaga
Gonzaga Bulldogs
Gonzaga Bulldogs